Facundo Ezequiel Almada (born 10 July 1998) is an Argentine professional footballer who plays as a centre-back for Rosario Central.

Career
Almada began his senior career with Rosario Central. Edgardo Bauza picked Almada on the substitutes bench for a Primera División fixture with Vélez Sarsfield on 3 December 2018, though didn't select the defender to come on in a 2–0 loss. Bauza soon left the club, with Paulo Ferrari replacing him at the helm and subsequently awarding Almada his professional debut from the start against Belgrano in March 2019.

Career statistics
.

References

External links

1998 births
Living people
Footballers from Rosario, Santa Fe
Argentine footballers
Association football defenders
Argentine Primera División players
Rosario Central footballers